Lisa Christina Llorens, OAM(born 17 January 1978) is an Australian Paralympic athlete. She was born in Canberra. She specialises in Paralympic high jumping, long jumping, and sprinting, participating in competitions for athletes with autism.

Llorens is known as "The Cheetah" because she has a great affinity with cheetahs. She commented "I feel like I have a connection with the cheetahs, because I'm quite shy, like a cat, and I run so fast." An educational documentary was made about her called Lisa Llorens: A Cheetah on the Track. From 1998 to 2002, she held an athletics scholarship from the Australian Institute of Sport for Athletes with a Disability.

Llorens competed at the 1996 Summer Paralympics in Atlanta, winning gold and bronze medals in track and field events. She received a Medal of the Order of Australia for her 1996 gold medal. She also represented Australia at the 2000 Summer Paralympics in Sydney, and won three gold medals in the 200 metre sprint, the high jump, and the long jump, and a silver medal in the 100 metre sprint. She broke the Paralympic world record three times during her four long jumps.

Llorens also competed at the IPC Athletics World Championships in 1994, winning silver in both the long jump and the 200m; and in 1998, won gold in the 100m, high jump, and long jump . She took part in the Paralympic World Cup in 1998, winning gold in the 100 metre sprint, the high jump and the long jump. In 2004, due to the International Paralympic Committee's decision to remove events for intellectually disabled athletes from its official activities, Llorens retired, as she felt that there was nothing left for her to achieve in sport.

The Australian Paralympic Committee describes her as "Australia’s most outstanding female athlete with an intellectual disability", along with Crystal-Lea Adams.
In 1997, she was awarded the Australian Capital Territory Female Sportstar of the Year, and Young Canberra Citizen of the Year. In November 2015, she was inducted into the ACT Sport Hall of Fame. In 2016, Llorens was induced into the International Sports Federation for Persons with Intellectual Disability (INAS) Hall of Fame.

References

External links

 "Australian cheetah hunts down rivals", The Daily Telegraph, 7 November 2000
Athletics Australia Results

1978 births
Athletes (track and field) at the 1996 Summer Paralympics
Athletes (track and field) at the 2000 Summer Paralympics
Australian female high jumpers
Australian female long jumpers
Australian female sprinters
Australian Institute of Sport Paralympic track and field athletes
Intellectual Disability category Paralympic competitors
Living people
Medalists at the 1996 Summer Paralympics
Medalists at the 2000 Summer Paralympics
Paralympic athletes of Australia
Paralympic bronze medalists for Australia
Paralympic gold medalists for Australia
Paralympic silver medalists for Australia
Sportspeople with autism
Recipients of the Medal of the Order of Australia
Sportswomen from the Australian Capital Territory
ACT Academy of Sport alumni
Competitors in athletics with intellectual disability
Paralympic medalists in athletics (track and field)
21st-century Australian women
20th-century Australian women